The 1976 Asian Basketball Confederation Championship for Women were held in Hong Kong.

Results

Final standing

Awards

References
 Results
 archive.fiba.com

1976
1976 in women's basketball
women
International women's basketball competitions hosted by Hong Kong
B